The Nairobi Convention is a partnership between governments, civil society and the private sector, working towards a prosperous Western Indian Ocean Region with healthy rivers, coasts and oceans. It pursues this vision by providing a mechanism for regional cooperation, coordination and collaborative actions; it enables the Contracting Parties to harness resources and expertise from a wide range of stakeholders and interest groups; and in this way it helps solve inter-linked problems of the region's coastal and marine environment.

History of the Convention 

The Nairobi Convention, which was first signed in 1985 and entered into force in 1996, is part of UN Environment's Regional Seas Programme. The programme aims to address the accelerating degradation of the world's oceans and coastal areas through the sustainable management and use of the marine and coastal environment. It does this by engaging countries that share the western Indian Ocean in actions to protect their shared marine environment. The Contracting Parties (Comoros, France, Kenya, Madagascar, Mauritius, Mozambique, Seychelles, Somalia, Tanzania and the Republic of South Africa) to the Convention are part of more than 143 countries that participate in 18 Regional Seas initiatives.

Implementation of projects 
The Nairobi Convention Secretariat has successfully implemented various projects within the Western Indian Ocean region through funding from organizations such as GEF and the Governments of Norway and Sweden and through partnerships with other organizations such as Western Indian Ocean Marine Science Association (WIOMSA), Birdlife International, African Union (AU), Indian Ocean Commission (IOC), WWF and IUCN. These include the project Addressing land-based Activities in the Western Indian Ocean (WIO-LaB) project (funded by GEF in 2004-2010) and the African Marine and Coastal Programme (funded by the Swedish government in 2011-2016).

Summary of the Amended Articles of the Convention 
The Nairobi Convention Secretariat held the Conference of Plenipotentiaries and the Sixth Conference of Parties (COP6) to the Nairobi Convention at the United Nations Environment Programme (UNEP) Headquarters at Gigiri in Nairobi Kenya, from 29 March to 1 April 2010, which considered and adopted the Amended Nairobi Convention for the Protection, Management and Development of the Marine and Coastal Environment of the Western Indian Ocean.

See also
Global Environment Facility

References

External links
Convention for the Protection, Management and Development of the Marine and Coastal Environment of the Eastern African Region, Treaty available in ECOLEX-the gateway to environmental law (English)

Environmental treaties
Nature conservation in Tanzania
1996 in the environment
Treaties concluded in 1985
Treaties entered into force in 1996
1985 in Kenya
Treaties of the Comoros
Treaties of France
Treaties of Kenya
Treaties of Madagascar
Treaties of Mauritius
Treaties of Mozambique
Treaties of Seychelles
Treaties of the Somali Democratic Republic
Treaties of Tanzania
Treaties of South Africa
Treaties concluded in 2010
Treaties extended to the French Southern and Antarctic Lands
Treaties extended to Mayotte
Treaties extended to Réunion